Delbert Ray Thompson (born February 21, 1958) is a former American football running back who played one season with the Kansas City Chiefs of the National Football League. He was drafted by the Kansas City Chiefs in the fifth round of the 1982 NFL Draft. He first enrolled at the University of Texas at Austin before transferring to Ranger College and lastly the University of Texas at El Paso. Thompson attended Hamlin High School in Hamlin, Texas. He was also a member of the New York Jets.

Professional career

Kansas City Chiefs
Thompson was selected by the Chiefs with the 130th pick in the 1982 NFL Draft. He played in six games for the Chiefs during the 1982 season. He was placed on the injured reserve list on August 23, 1983.

New York Jets
Thompson was claimed on waivers by the New York Jets from Kansas City on April 10, 1984.

References

External links
Just Sports Stats
College stats

Living people
1958 births
Players of American football from Texas
American football running backs
African-American players of American football
Texas Longhorns football players
Ranger Rangers football players
UTEP Miners football players
Kansas City Chiefs players
People from Kermit, Texas
21st-century African-American people
20th-century African-American sportspeople